The 2021 Madrid Open (sponsored by Mutua) was a professional tennis tournament played on outdoor clay courts at the Park Manzanares in Madrid, Spain from 29 April – 9 May 2021. It was the 19th edition of the event on the ATP Tour and 12th on the WTA Tour. It was classified as an ATP Tour Masters 1000 event on the 2021 ATP Tour and a WTA 1000 event on the 2021 WTA Tour.

The tournament's 2020 edition, which was originally scheduled for 1 to 10 May 2020, and that was later rescheduled to 12 to 20 September 2020 was effectively cancelled on 4 August 2020 after an onset of the COVID-19 pandemic in Spain.

Ion Țiriac, the event owner, eventually sold the tournament at the end of the year to IMG for approximately $283 Million.

Champions

Men's singles
 
  Alexander Zverev def.  Matteo Berrettini, 6–7(8–10), 6–4, 6–3.

Women's singles
 
  Aryna Sabalenka def.  Ashleigh Barty, 6–0, 3–6, 6–4

Men's doubles
 
  Marcel Granollers /  Horacio Zeballos def.  Nikola Mektić /  Mate Pavić, 1–6, 6–3, [10–8]

Women's doubles
 
  Barbora Krejčíková /  Kateřina Siniaková def.  Gabriela Dabrowski /  Demi Schuurs, 6–4, 6–3

Points and prize money

Point distribution

Prize money

*per team

References

External links
 Official website